Maesteg Castle Street railway station served the town of Maesteg, Glamorgan, Wales from 1864 to 1970 on the Llynvi and Ogmore Railway.

History 
The station opened as Maesteg on 25 February 1864 by the Great Western Railway. Its name was changed to Maesteg Castle Street on 1 July 1924. It closed to both passengers and goods traffic on 22 June 1970, having been listed for closure in Dr Beechings 1963,'The Reshaping of British Railways'. School services continued until 14 July 1970.

References 

British Railways Board (BRB), The Reshaping of British Railways: Part 1: Report (London, 1963), p.128: https://www.railwaysarchive.co.uk/docsummary.php?docID=13.

External links 

Disused railway stations in Bridgend County Borough
Former Great Western Railway stations
Railway stations in Great Britain opened in 1861
Railway stations in Great Britain closed in 1970
1861 establishments in Wales
1970 disestablishments in Wales
Beeching closures in Wales